A Mud Agitator is used in surface mud systems to suspend solids and maintain homogeneous mixture throughout the system. A mechanical agitator is driven by an explosion-proof motor, coupled to a gear box that drives the impeller shaft. The impellers (turbines) transform mechanical power into fluid circulation or agitation. The objective is to obtain a uniform suspension of all solids.

Types of Agitator Mounting
Horizontally mounted agitator
Vertically mounted agitator

Types of agitating shaft seal
Mechanical seal 
Packing seal

Types of Agitator Impellers

Radial Flow Impeller.  Figure 1  shows a radial flow created by the impellers wherein the circulation is predominantly horizontal.
Axial Flow Impellers. Figure 2 shows an axial flow created by the impellers wherein the circulation is predominantly axial fluid movement.

Types of Impeller Blades
Flat blade impeller
Canted blade impeller
Contour blade impeller

Notes

Drilling fluid